Igor Georgievich Artamonov (born March 14, 1967, Budyonnovsk, Stavropol Krai, RSFSR, USSR) is a  Russian politician and statesman, who is the 4th head of administration of the Lipetsk Oblast since October 2, 2018.

Medal of the Order  For Merit to the Fatherland  II class awarded by presidential decree of  Vladimir Putin (2011). In 2018 he received an Order of Honour.

Trained in human resources management development program Russian Presidential Academy of National Economy and Public Administration.

See also
 List of Governors of Lipetsk Oblast

References

External links
 Official site 
  Дембельский альбом Игоря Артамонова

1967 births
Living people
People from Budyonnovsk
Recipients of the Order of Honour (Russia)
Recipients of the Medal of the Order "For Merit to the Fatherland" II class
Heads of Lipetsk Oblast
Plekhanov Russian University of Economics alumni
Higher School of Economics alumni
Russian Presidential Academy of National Economy and Public Administration alumni